Géza Nagy  (29 December 1892, Satoraljaujhely – 13 August 1953, Kaposvár) was a Hungarian chess master.

He was Hungarian Champion in 1924. He took 6th at Budapest 1926 (Grandmasters Ernst Grünfeld and Mario Monticelli won).

Nagy played for Hungary in Chess Olympiads:
 In 1927 at second board in 1st Chess Olympiad in London (+8 –3 =3);
 In 1928 at first board in 2nd Chess Olympiad in The Hague (+9 –2 =5).
He won two team gold medals there.

Nagy was awarded the International Master (IM) title in 1950.

References 

1892 births
1953 deaths
Hungarian chess players
Chess International Masters
Chess Olympiad competitors
20th-century chess players